Chadli or Chedli is an Arab given name and surname.

Given name
Chadli Bendjedid (1929-2012), former President of Algeria
Chedli Klibi (1925-2020), former Tunisian politician and secretary General of the Arab League
Chadli Amri (born 1984), Algerian footballer
Family name
Nacer Chadli (born 1989), Belgian footballer
Adel Chedli (born 1976), Tunisian footballer

Arabic masculine given names